Parliamentary elections were held in Armenia on 20 May 1990, although further rounds were held on 3 June and 15 July due to low turnouts invalidating earlier results. By 21 July, 64 seats were still unfilled, with 16 still unfilled in February the following year. The result was a victory for the Communist Party of Armenia, which won 136 of the 259 seats. The remaining candidates were all officially independents, but almost all were members of the Pan-Armenian National Movement. Overall voter turnout was 60.2%.

Results

References

1990 in Armenia
Parliamentary elections in Armenia
Armenia
May 1990 events in Europe
1990s in Armenian politics
Election and referendum articles with incomplete results